Jeannette Caines was an American author of children's books, most notably Abby, Chilly Stomach and Just Us Women, a Reading Rainbow book. She was born and raised in Harlem, New York and worked as a Manuscript Coordinator. In 1989, Jeannette retired and relocated to Charlottesville, VA. She was the recipient of the National Black Child Developmental Institute's Certificate of Merit and Appreciation and the Charlottesville Lifetime Achievement Award (2004). In addition to this, Jeannette was the owner/operator of a small book store located in Charlottesville named THE PURPLE ALLIGATOR. Later in 2004, she was diagnosed with cancer and died on July 11. She had two children Alexander (deceased 2015) and Abby who still resides in New York.

Bibliography

Books

 Abby (1973)
 Daddy (1977)
 Window Wishing (1980)
 Just Us Women (1984)
 I Need a Lunch Box (1988)

References

External links
 http://www.harpercollins.com/cr-107798/jeannette-caine

African-American literature
2004 deaths
African-American women writers
American women children's writers
American children's writers
African-American writers
21st-century African-American people
21st-century African-American women